The Spring Champion Stakes is an Australian Turf Club Group 1 Thoroughbred horse race for three-year-olds at Set Weights over a distance of 2000 metres at Randwick Racecourse, Sydney, Australia in October.  Prize money is A$2,000,000.

History
The race has been won by horses that later became champions. These include Kingston Town, Beau Zam and Tie the Knot. The Gloaming Stakes is considered a major preparatory race for this event.

Name
Originally when the race was inaugurated it was known as the Australasian Champion Stakes. The event was changed to its current name in 1978.

Grade
 1971–1978 - Principal Race
 1979 onwards - Group 1

Distance
 1971 - 1 miles (~2000 metres)
 1972–1982 – 2000 metres
 1983 – 2100 metres
 1984–2000 – 2000 metres
 2001 – 1800 metres (run at Randwick's inner course known as the Kensington)
 2002 onwards - 2000 metres

Venue
 1971–1982 - Randwick Racecourse
 1983 - Warwick Farm Racecourse
 1984 onwards - Randwick Racecourse

Winners

 2022 - Sharp 'n' Smart
 2021 - Profondo
 2020 - Montefilia
 2019 - Shadow Hero
 2018 - Maid Of Heaven
 2017 - Ace High
 2016 - Yankee Rose
 2015 - Vanbrugh
 2014 - Hampton Court
 2013 - Complacent
 2012 - It's A Dundeel
 2011 - Doctor Doom
 2010 - Erewhon
 2009 - Monaco Consul
 2008 - Sousa
 2007 - †race not held
 2006 - Teranaba
 2005 - Hotel Grand
 2004 - Savabeel
 2003 - Niello
 2002 - Platinum Scissors
 2001 - Viking Ruler
 2000 - Universal Prince
 1999 - Fairway
 1998 - Dignity Dancer
 1997 - Tie the Knot
 1996 - Magic of Sydney
 1995 - Nothin’ Leica Dane
 1994 - Danewin
 1993 - Fraternity
 1992 - Coronation Day
 1991 - Kinjite
 1990 - St. Jude
 1989 - Stylish Century
 1988 - Sakana
 1987 - Beau Zam
 1986 - Imprimatur
 1985 - Easter
 1984 - Lucks A Lottery
 1983 - Sir Dapper
 1982 - Veloso
 1981 - Best Western
 1980 - Prince Majestic
 1979 - Kingston Town
 1978 - Lefroy
 1977 - Sir Silver Lad
 1976 - Cheyne Walk
 1975 - Taras Bulba
 1974 - Asgard
 1973 - Gold Brick
 1972 - Latin Knight
 1971 - Gay Icarus

† Not held because of outbreak of equine influenza

See also
 List of Australian Group races
 Group races

References

Flat horse races for three-year-olds
Group 1 stakes races in Australia
Randwick Racecourse